Kaspar Johann Kummer (1795–1870) was a German flautist, professor and composer.

Kummer was born on 10 December 1795 in Erlau in Thuringia (in Sankt Kilian.)  He taught himself the flute while learning violin, horn, trumpet, clarinet, bassoon, oboe, cello and double bassoon.

Kummer was taught by Neumeister for a year, then took training in music theory from the Cantor of Schleusingen, Gottlob Abraham Stäps. From 1835, he worked as a flautist at the chapel of the Duke of Saxe-Coburg and Gotha, and took over direction of their orchestra in 1854.

His published compositions ran to over 150 opus numbers, mostly involving the flute, but also including lieder, etc.

He also had several students, including Friedrich Kiel and Felix Draeseke.

He died in May 1870, probably on 21 May, in Coburg.

Notes

Further reading 
 Fürstenau, Moritz. Allegemeine Deutsche Biographie (Wikisource. From Band 17, 1883. In German.)

External links 
  (compositions, partial worklist)

1795 births
1870 deaths
German classical composers
German classical flautists
German male classical composers
People from Hildburghausen (district)
19th-century German musicians
19th-century German male musicians